The 32d Flying Training Wing is an inactive United States Air Force unit.  It was last assigned to the Central Flying Training Command, and was disbanded on 13 October 1946 at the Randolph Field, Texas.

There is no lineage between the United States Air Force 32d Composite Wing, established on 22 November 1940 as the 32d Pursuit Group (Fighter) at Rio Hato Army Airbase, Panama, and this organization.

History
The wing was a World War II Command and Control organization which supported Training Command Basic Flight Schools.   At the schools, Phase II Basic Pilot Training taught the cadets to fly in formation, fly by instruments or by aerial navigation, fly at night, and fly for long distances. Cadets got about 70 flight hours in trainers before being promoted to Advanced Training.

Lineage
 Established as 32d Flying Training Wing on 17 December 1942.
 Activated on 16 January 1943
 Disbanded on 13 October 1946

Assignments
 Army Air Forces Gulf Coast Training Center, 16 January 1943
 Re-designated: Central Flying Training Command, 31 July 1943-13 October 1946.

Training aircraft
The primary aircraft used was the Vultee BT-13 Valiant twin-seat, single engine trainer.  Mid-1930s era North American BT-9s were flown at Randolph until 1943. The North American BT-14 and the Vultee BT-15 were also used, the BT-15 being a higher-horsepower version of the BT-13.

Beginning in late 1944 the USAAF (as well as the USN) began replacing the Vultee BT-13 / BT-15 Valiant from the Basic phase of flight training with the North American AT-6 Texan

Assigned Pilot Schools

 Curtis Field, Brady, Texas
 AAF Contract Pilot School (Basic)
 Opened: May 1941, Closed: August 1945 (PT-17, PT-19, BT-13, BT-15)
 Operated by: Brady Aviation School, Dallas Aviation School and Air College; three auxiliary airfields; the school, originally for primary flight training, was used for basic training twice in its history but had reverted to primary training when it was closed.

 Coffeyville Army Airfield, Coffeyville, Kansas
 AAF Pilot School (Basic)
 47th Basic Flying Training Group
 Opened: October 1942, Closed: May 1944 (BT-13)
 Basic flying school closed May 1944; became Third Air Force photo-reconnaissance pilot training school (F-5E Mustang), Closed October 1945

 Enid Army Airfield, Enid, Oklahoma
 AAF Pilot School (Basic)
 48th Basic Flying Training Group
 Opened: December 1941, Closed: January 1945 (BT-13, BT-15)
 Basic flying school closed January 1945; became advanced twin-engine school (B-25) February 1945.  Remained open as a permanent training airfield after war ended, now Vance Air Force Base

 Garden City Army Airfield, Garden City, Kansas
 AAF Pilot School (Basic)
 49th Basic Flying Training Group
 Opened: December 1942, Closed: December 1944 (BT-13)

 Goodfellow Field, San Angelo, Texas
 AAF Pilot School (Basic)
 53d Basic Flying Training Group
 Opened: May 1941, Closed: December 1944 (BT-13, BT-14)
 Added advanced single-engine school (AT-6) January 1945; Remained open as a permanent training airfield after war ended, now Goodfellow Air Force Base

 Independence Army Airfield, Independence, Kansas
 AAF Pilot School (Basic)
 Opened: January 1942, Closed: January 1945 (BT-14, BT-15)
 Aircraft Fuselage Code: "S"

 Malden Army Airfield, Malden, Missouri
 AAF Pilot School (Basic)
 Opened: March 1943, Closed: May 1945 (BT-13)
 Aircraft Fuselage Code: "ML"; Basic flying school closed January 1945; became glider training school under I Troop Carrier Command, closed September 1945.

 Majors Army Airfield, Greenville, Texas
 AAF Pilot School (Basic)
 50th Basic Flying Training Group
 Opened: August 1942, Closed: November 1944 (BT-13)
 Basic flying school closed November 1944; reassigned to II Fighter Command and became P-47 Replacement Training Unit; Airfield closed July 1945

 Perrin Field, Sherman, Texas
 AAF Pilot School (Basic)
 53d Basic Flying Training Group
 Opened: January 1942, Closed: January 1944 (BT-13)
 Aircraft Fuselage Code: "N"; Basic flying school closed March 1945; became advanced single-engine school (AT-6); Remained open as a permanent training airfield after war ended as Perrin Air Force Base, Closed 1971.

 Randolph Field, San Antonio, Texas
 AAF Pilot School (Basic)
 Airfield opened 1931 as primary Air Corps Basic Flying training school.  Wartime Basic school operated BT-9 and BT-14s, closed April 1944, became Advanced school with AT-6s
 Basic aircraft Fuselage Code: "C"; Remained open as a permanent training airfield after war ended; now Randolph Air Force Base

 Strother Army Airfield, Winfield, Kansas
 AAF Pilot School (Basic)
 Opened: November 1942, Closed: May 1944 (BT-13)
 Aircraft Fuselage Code: "K" (Used as a suffix); Basic flying school closed May 1944; reassigned to II Fighter Command and became P-47 Replacement Training Unit; Airfield closed August 1945

 Waco Army Airfield, Waco, Texas
 AAF Pilot School (Basic)
 54th Basic Flying Training Group
 Opened: April 1942, Closed: September 1944 (BT-13)
 Basic flying school closed September 1944; Became advanced single-engine (AT-6), also twin-engine (UC-78) school, airfield closed September 1945; later reopened 1948 as Connally Air Force Base, closed 1969

Stations
 Perrin Field, Texas, 16 January 1943
 Randolph Field, Texas
 Temporary assignment 31 Oct 1945, became permanent station on 5 August-13 October 1946

See also

 Army Air Forces Training Command
 Other Training Command Basic Flight Training Wings:
 27th Flying Training Wing (World War II)  Eastern Flying Training Command
 35th Flying Training Wing (World War II)  Western Flying Training Command
 Other Central Flying Training Command Flight Training Wings:
 31st Flying Training Wing (World War II) Primary Flight Training
 33d Flying Training Wing (World War II) Advanced Flight Training
 33d Flying Training Wing (World War II) Advanced Flight Training, Two Engine
 34th Flying Training Wing (World War II) Bombardier and Specialized Two/Four-Engine Training
 77th Flying Training Wing (World War II) Advanced Flight Training, Single Engine
 80th Flying Training Wing (World War II) Navigation and Glider

References

Training wings of the United States Army Air Forces
Military units and formations established in 1942
Military units and formations disestablished in 1945